William T. Williams (born 1942) is an American painter and educator. He is known for his process-based approach to painting that engages motifs drawn from personal memory and cultural narrative to create non-referential, abstract compositions. He was a Professor of Art at Brooklyn College, City University of New York from 1971 to 2008.

He has exhibited in over 100 museums and art centers in the United States, France, Germany, Russia, Venezuela, Nigeria, Ivory Coast, People's Republic of China and Japan. Williams is a recipient of numerous awards including a John Simon Guggenheim Fellowship, two National Endowment for the Arts Awards, and a Joan Mitchell Foundation Award. He is also a recipient of the Studio Museum in Harlem's Artist Award in 1992 and received The James Van Dee Zee Award from the Brandywine Workshop for lifetime achievement in the arts in 2005. He received the 2006 North Carolina Award for Fine Arts, the highest civilian honor the state can bestow.

Williams lives in both New York City and Connecticut.

Early childhood and education

William T. Williams was born on July 17, 1942, in Cross Creek, North Carolina, United States. Williams is African American. His family moved to Queens, New York City at age 4, but he spent his childhood summers in Spring Lake, North Carolina. After the family's move to the north, his art talent was recognized by the head of a local community center, who gave him a room there to use as a studio. In 1956, he attended the School of Industrial Art in Manhattan (now the High School of Art and Design), which held many of its art classes at the Museum of Modern Art and the Metropolitan Museum of Art.

In 1962, Williams entered Pratt Institute to study painting. At Pratt Institute he studied under Richard Lindner, Philip Pearlstein, Alex Katz, and Richard Bove. During his junior year, he won a summer scholarship to The Skowhegan School of Art, and received a National Endowment for the Arts traveling grant. While in school he explored color field painting. He received a Bachelor of Fine Arts (BFA) degree in 1966 from Pratt Institute; followed by a Master of Fine Arts (MFA) degree in 1968 from Yale University, School of Art and Architecture.

The late 1960s and the 1970s 

Williams quickly gained attention from the mainstream art world. The Museum of Modern Art acquired his composition "Elbert Jackson L.A.M.F., Part II" in 1969, and by 1970 his work was being exhibited at the Fondation Maeght in the south of France.

From 1968 until 1970, Williams helped organize the Smokehouse painters (including Melvin Edwards, Guy Ciarcia, and Billy Rose) to paint murals in Harlem, using a hard-edge style. In 1969 he participated in The Black Artist in America: A Symposium, held at the Metropolitan Museum of Art. He also took part in numerous exhibitions including the Studio Museum in Harlem's Inaugural Show, X to the Fourth Power, and New Acquisitions held at the Museum of Modern Art. In 1970 Williams was commissioned by the Jewish Museum (New York), and the Menil Collection in Houston, Texas.

Williams started the artist-in-residency program at the Studio Museum in Harlem. Kinshasa Conwill, former director of the Studio Museum in Harlem, says that the program "has become critical to the museum's identity and its contribution to the larger art arena."

Williams' first one-man show at New York's Reese Palley Gallery in 1971, resulted in the sale of every painting. The same year, the Whitney Museum of American Art exhibited his work twice; collectors such as AT&T and General Mills purchased his art; and his work was featured in both Life and Time magazines. Valerie J. Mercer

Williams returned home to the dusty unpaved roads of North Carolina for the inspiration of a new palette, one born of the luster and glow of mica, false gold, and fox fire from earth's pulsating cover. Williams' relief from color-field painting was celebrated in the new works completed between 1971 and 1977, such as Equinox and Indian Summer. In 1975 William also took part in an artist in residence program at Fisk University in Nashville, Tennessee.

In 1977, Williams participated in the second World Festival of Black Arts and African Culture in Lagos, Nigeria (FESTAC). This festival brought together more than 17,000 artists of African descent from 59 countries. It was the largest cultural event ever held on the African continent.

Starting in 1979, Williams changed his painting composition style by dividing the canvas into two distinct sections.

The 1980s

In 1982 Williams was included in Recent Acquisitions of the Schomburg Collection at the Schomburg Center in New York. In 1984 William took part in a show titled Since the Harlem Renaissance, which traveled to the University of Maryland, Bucknell University and the State University of New York at Old Westbury. It also traveled to the Munson-Williams-Proctor Arts Institute in Utica, New York, and the Chrysler Museum of Art in Norfolk, Virginia.

In 1987 William received the John Simon Guggenheim Fellowship. He also was a member of a show that took place in Tokyo, Japan entitled The Art of Black America in Japan.  William also took part in Contemporary Visual Expressions, a show at the Anacostia Museum and Smithsonian Institution in Washington, D.C..

William's traveled to Venezuela with painter Jack Whitten and sculptors Mel Edwards and Tyrone Mitchell for the opening of their exhibition Espiritu & Materia at the Museum of Visual Arts, Alejandro Otero.

The 1990s
In 1992 Williams was presented the Studio Museum in Harlem Artist's Award for lifetime achievement and his role in creating the artist-in-residence program for the museum.Robert Blackburn first invited Williams to make a print at the Printmaking Workshop in 1975.  Over the next 22 years, Williams collaborated with Blackburn to produce 19 editions and a number of unique print projects.  His last project at the Printmaking Workshop was in 1997 when he produced a number of monoprints underwritten by art patron, Major Thomas.

In 2000 Williams took part in an extensive traveling show entitled To Conserve a Legacy: American Art from Historically Black Colleges and Universities. The show organized by the Addison Gallery of American Art at Phillips Academy in Andover, Massachusetts and the Studio Museum in Harlem in New York traveled to eight major museums including the Corcoran Gallery of Art, the Art Institute of Chicago, Fisk University, Duke University and Hampton Universities Art museums.

In 1994 Williams participated in a Jazz at Lincoln Center program titled "Swing Landscapes: Jazz Visualized".  The intent of the Jazz Talk program was to explore what it is about jazz that makes its colors, rhythms and characters so attractive to the painter's eye. Williams and author, Alfred Appel, Jr. discussed the influence of jazz on modern art.  This program was part of a New York Citywide celebration honoring the artist Romare Bearden.

Late life
In 2005, Williams was invited to create a print at the Brandywine Workshop in conjunction with receiving the James Van Der Zee Award for Lifetime Achievement.   Between July and late August he made five trips to Philadelphia, staying several days at a time.  These trips yielded four editions and a number of unique hand-colored prints. The Brandywine Workshop located in Philadelphia was founded in 1972 to promote interest and talent in printmaking while cultivating cultural diversity in the arts.

In 2006, Williams was a visiting scholar and artist in residence at Lafayette College's Experimental Printmaking Institute (EPI), which included Williams lecture about his work sponsored by the David L. Sr. and Helen J. Temple Visiting Lecture Series Fund.  During this year, Williams' work was also shown at the Studio Museum in Harlem in Energy and Experimentation: Black Artists and Abstraction 1964–1980.

In 2006, William T. Williams received the North Carolina Governors Award for Fine Arts by Governor Mike Easley.

In 2007, Williams was part of the group exhibition What Is Painting? Contemporary Art from the Collection at the Museum of Modern Art in New York City.

Collections 
Williams is represented in numerous public museum collections including the Museum of Modern Art; the Whitney Museum of American Art; the Governor Nelson A. Rockefeller Empire State Plaza Art Collection; the National Gallery of Art; North Carolina Museum of Art; the Schomburg Center for Research in Black Culture; the Menil Collection; Fogg Art Museum, one of the Harvard Art Museums; the Studio Museum in Harlem; the Library of Congress; and the Yale University Art Gallery.

Awards and grants
North Carolina Governor's Award for Fine Arts, North Carolina, 2006
James Van Der Zee Award, Brandywine Workshop, Philadelphia, Pennsylvania, 2005
Joan Mitchell Foundation, Grant Award, 1996
Mid-Atlantic/NEA Regional Fellowship,1994
The Studio Museum in Harlem Artist's Award,1992
John Simon Guggenheim Fellowship, 1987
City University of New York, Faculty Research Award, Painting, 1987, 1984, 1973
Creative Arts Public Service Grant, Painting, New York, 1985, 1981
National Endowment for the Arts, Individual Artist Award, Painting, 1970
Yale University, Grant for Graduate Study, New Haven, Connecticut, 1966
National Endowment for the Arts, Traveling Grant, 1965

References

Sources and further reading
25 Years of African-American Art: The Studio Museum in Harlem, The Studio Museum in Harlem, New York  1994
African-American Printmaking - 1838 to the Present, The Rockland Center of the Arts, West Nyack, New York, 1995
African American Works on Paper, The Cochran Collection, Atlanta, Georgia, 1991
American Images: The SBC Collection of Twentieth-Century American Art, New York: Harry N. Abrams Inc., 1996 
American Paintings at Yale University, Yale University Art Gallery, New Haven 1982
Artist and Influence, Hatch Billops Collection, Inc. New York, Vol. XXIV, 2005, 
The Chemistry of Color, The Harold A. and Ann R. Sorgenti Collection of Contemporary African- American Art, Pennsylvania Academy of Fine Arts, Philadelphia, 
Artists Salute Skowhegan, Kennedy Galleries, New York, 
Ashton, Dore; American Art Since 1945, Oxford University Press, 1982
Ashton, Dore; Drawings by New York Artists, Utah Museum of Fine Arts, 1972
Ashton, Dore; William T. Williams, Miami-Dade Community College Publication, November 1977
Ashton, Dore; "Young Abstract Painters; Right On!", Arts Magazine, February 1970
Baur, John; Whitney Museum of American Art: Catalogue of the Colle, Whitney Museum of American Art, New York 1974
"Behind Closed Doors", American Visions Magazine, April 1991, Vol. 6  No 2
The Black Artist in America:  A Symposium, The Metropolitan Museum of Art Bulletin, January 1969  Vol XXVII  No 5
Bloom, Janet; "In the Museums", Arts Magazine, December 1969 – 1970
Bowling, Frank, "Discussion on Black Art-II", Arts Magazine, 1970 Vol 3
Bowling, Frank; "Problems of Criticism", Arts Magazine Vol. 46  No 7
"Canvasses Brimming with Color", Life Magazine  September 1971  Vol  71
Convergence, James E. Lewis Museum of Art, Morgan State University, Newark, Delaware, 
Cortez, Jane; "Conversation with Three Artists", Black Orpheus  Vol. 3  Nos 2&3, 1975
Cotter, Holland; "Energy and Abstraction at the Studio Museum in Harlem", The New York Times, Friday, April 7, 2006
Cutter, Holland; "Getting Personal and Cultural in the Abstract", The New York Times, Friday, August 28, 1992
Dedication Exhibition, James E. Lewis Museum of Art, Baltimore Maryland, 1990
Deluxe Show, Menil Foundation, Rice University, Houston, Texas 1972
Driskell, David C. (ed); African American Visual Aesthetics - A Post Modernist View, Washington, D.C.: Smithsonian Institution Press, 1995
Driskell, David C.; Amistad II: Afro-American Art, Fisk University, Nashville, Tennessee, 
Driskell, David C.; Contemporary Visual Expressions, Smithsonian Institution Press, Washington, D.C.  1987
Driskell, David C.; William T. Williams, University of Wisconsin Publication, 1980
East-West Contemporary Art, California Afro-American Museum, California, 
Echlin, Hobey; "Spirit and Chance", Metro Times, Detroit, July 6-July 12, 1994
The Empire State Collection: Art for the Public Harry Abrams, Inc., New York  1987  
Espiritu & Materia, Museo de Artes Visuales Alejandro Otero, Caracas, Venezuela, 1991
Fine, Elsa Honig; The Afro-American  Artist-A Search for Identity, Holt, Rinehart & Winston, Inc., 
Fourteen Paintings/William T. Williams, The Montclair Museum of Art, Montclair, New Jersey, 1991, 
Gilliam, Sam; "Al Loving, William T. Williams", Dialogue-An Art Journal, January/February 1995
Goode-Bryant and Philips, Contextures, 
The Governor Nelson A. Rockefeller Empire State Plaza Art Collection and Plaza Memorials, New York: Rizzoli International Publications, Inc.,  2002
Images of America: African American Voices, Selections from the Collection of Mr. And Mrs. Darrell Walker, Walton Arts Center, Fayetteville, Arkansas, 
Janson, H.W.; The History of Art, Third Edition, Harry Abrams, Inc.  1987   
Jones, Kellie & Sims, Lowery Stikes; Energy/Experimentation: Black Artists and Abstraction 1964-1990, The Studio Museum in Harlem, New York, 2006, 
Jones, Walter; "Two Black Artists", Arts Magazine, April 1970
Kenkeleba House, Inc.  New York   1991
Kingsley, April; "From Explosion to  Implosion: The Ten Year Transition of William T. Williams", Arts Magazine, v. 55, n. 6, February 1981
Konstantin, Lynne; Art & Antiques, March 1999
Mellow, James R.; "The Black Artist; The Black Art Community; The White Art World", New York Times, June 29, 1970
Miro, Marsha; "Master Colorist", Detroit Free Press, Detroit, Michigan, Sunday, July 3, 1994
Narratives of African American Art and Identity: The David C. Driskell Collection, Pomegranate Communications, Inc., San Francisco, 1998, 
North Carolina Museum of the Arts:  Handbook of the Collections, New York: Hudson Hills Press, 1998, 
Oren, Michael; "The Smokehouse Painters, 1968-1970", Black American Literature Forum, Fall 1990, Vol. 24, No. 3
The Other Side of Color: African American Art in the Collection of Camille O. and William H. Cosby, Pomegranate Communications, Inc., San Francisco, 2001
Painting and Sculpture Today, Indianapolis Museum of Art, Indianapolis, Indiana, 1972
Patton, Sharon F.; "African American Art", Oxford History of Art; Oxford, 1998
The Permanent Collection of the Studio Museum in Harlem, The Studio Museum in Harlem, New York, 1982, 
Perreault, John; "Mideast Pipeline", SoHo Weekly News, January 14, 1981
Perreault, John; "Positively Black", SoHo Weekly News, February 27, 1980
Potter, Margaret; American Contemporary Art, American Embassy, Russia, Museum of Modern Art, New York 1969
Powell, Richard & Reynolds, Jock; To Conserve a Legacy: American Art from Historically Black Colleges and Universities, Addison Gallery of American Art, Phillips Academy, Andover, Massachusetts and The Studio Museum in Harlem, New York, 1999
Revisiting American Art:  Works from the Collections of Historically Black Colleges and Universities, Katonah Museum of Art, Katonah, New York, 1997
Rickey, Carrie; "Singular  Work, Double Blind, Triple Threat", Village Voice, March 3, 1980
Russell, Stella Pandell; Art in the World, Holt, Rinehart and Winston, 1984, 
Sandler, Irving; Critic's Choice 1969-70, New York State Council on the Arts Publication
Sandler, Irving; Visiting Artists, New York State Council on the Arts, New York, 1972
Schjeldahl, Peter; "A Triumph Rather Than a Threat", New York Times, August 27, 1969
The Search for Freedom-African-American Abstract Painting 1945-1975
Seeing Jazz: Artists and Writers on Jazz, Smithsonian Institution Traveling Exhibition/Chronicle Books, Washington, D.C. 1997
A Selection of American Art-The Skowhegan School 1946–1976, Institute of Contemporary Art, Boston, 
Serwer, Jacquelyn Day; Extensions, Wadsworth Atheneum  1974, 
Shaw, Penny; "William T. Williams," Homes of Color, v. 5, iss. 1, January/February 2006
Sims, Lowery Stokes; "36. The Mirror the Other: The Politics of Esthetics", Art Forum, March 1990, XXVIII, No. 7
Sims, Lowery Stokes; Vivian Browne/William T. Williams, Jamaica Arts Center, Jamaica, New York, 1988
Since the Harlem Renaissance-50 Years of Afro-American Art, Center Gallery of Bucknell University, Lewisberg, Pennsylvania, 1985, 
Successions: Prints by African American Artists from the Jean and Robert Steele Collection, The Art Gallery, University of Maryland, College Park  2002, .
The Structure of Color, Whitney Museum of American Art, New York, April 1971
Taha, Halima; Collecting African American Art, New York: Crown Publishers Inc, 1998, 
Twardy, Chuck; "Improving with Age", The News & Observer, Raleigh, North Carolina, Sunday, July 18, 1993
Twentieth Century African American Art from the Collection of Mr. and Mrs. Darrell Walker, University of Arkansas at Little Rock, Arkansas]] 1996
Using Walls, Jewish Museum Publication, 1970
Weld, Allison; A Force of Repetition, New Jersey State Museum, Trenton, New Jersey, 1990
"William T. Williams, Artist", Bay Street Banner, Boston, Massachusetts, August 20, 1970
Wilson, Judith; "A Serene Indifference", Village Voice, January 21, 1981
Works on Paper/William T. Willilams, The Studio Museum in Harlem, New York, 1992, 
"X to the 4th Power", Arts Magazine, September 1969
Zimmer, William; "A 'Painterly' Show in Jersey City", The New York Times, October 30, 1988

1942 births
Living people
African-American contemporary artists
American contemporary artists
American contemporary painters
20th-century American painters
American male painters
21st-century American painters
Pratt Institute alumni
Yale School of Art alumni
People from Fayetteville, North Carolina
High School of Art and Design alumni
Brooklyn College faculty
20th-century African-American painters
21st-century African-American artists
20th-century American male artists